Kelly Bindle is a Canadian provincial politician, who was elected as the Member of the Legislative Assembly of Manitoba for the riding of Thompson in the 2016 election. He is a member of the Progressive Conservative Party of Manitoba. He defeated incumbent New Democratic Party MLA Steve Ashton in the election. Ashton had served continuously since 1981.

Bindle lost his seat to NDP candidate Danielle Adams in the 2019 Manitoba general election.

Election results

References

Living people
21st-century Canadian politicians
People from Thompson, Manitoba
Progressive Conservative Party of Manitoba MLAs
Year of birth missing (living people)